The Academy of Technology or AOT is a self-financed undergraduate engineering college in Adisaptagram, Hooghly, West Bengal, India. It was established in 2003 by Ananda Educational Development and Charitable Organisation, a trust. The college is affiliated to Maulana Abul Kalam Azad University of Technology and all the programmes are approved by the All India Council for Technical Education. 

The campus is located on the side of G.T. road at Adisaptagram, Hooghly. The college is only 200 meters away from Adisaptagram railway station, next station to Bandel on Howrah–Barddhaman main line [Eastern Railway] and only 70 to 80 minutes journey from Howrah railway station. Kolkata Airport is only 47 km away.

Kanchrapara railway station (North 24 Parganas) is 9.4 KM and Kalyani railway station (Nadia) is 10.4 KM from Academy of Technology.

Academics
The institute offers six B.Tech. courses along with five postgraduate courses:-

 B.Tech. in computer science and engineering (CSE) – 4 years [Approved intake – 180]
 B.Tech. in computer science and business system (CSBS) – 4 years [Approved intake – 60]
 B.Tech. in electronics and communication engineering (ECE) – 4 years [Approved intake – 180]
 B.Tech. in electrical and electronics engineering (EEE) – 4 years [Approved intake – 60]
 B.Tech. in electrical engineering (EE) – 4 years [Approved intake – 60]
 B.Tech. in mechanical engineering (ME) – 4 years [Approved intake – 60]
 Master's degree in Computer Applications (M.C.A.) – 2 years [Approved intake – 60]

See also 
 List of institutions of higher education in West Bengal

References

External links
 AOT Official website

Colleges affiliated to West Bengal University of Technology
Universities and colleges in Hooghly district
Educational institutions established in 2003
2003 establishments in West Bengal